Christ Church, Over Wyresdale, stands in an isolated position to the west of the village of Abbeystead, Lancashire, England.  The church is recorded in the National Heritage List for England as a designated Grade II listed building.  It is an active Anglican parish church in the diocese of Blackburn, the archdeaconry of Lancaster, and the deanery of Lancaster.  Its benefice is combined with those of St Mark, Dolphinholme, and St Peter, Quernmore.

The church dates from 1733, replacing a chapel dating back to the 15th century, and it was restored in 1894 by the Chester architect John Douglas who added a spire to the tower, buttresses for the tower, a new south porch, a new vestry, and also built a new sanctuary. It is built in sandstone rubble with slate roofs and consists of a west tower, a nave with a chancel, a south porch, and a north vestry.  The pulpit is dated 1684.

See also

Listed buildings in Over Wyresdale
List of church restorations, amendments and furniture by John Douglas

References

External links
Photograph from Genuki
British History Online

Churches completed in 1733
Churches completed in 1894
19th-century Church of England church buildings
Over Wyresdale, Christ Church
Over Wyresdale, Christ Church
Over Wyresdale, Christ Church
Over Wyresdale, Christ Church
Over Wyresdale, Christ Church